The 1998–99 Utah Utes men's basketball team represented the University of Utah as a member of the Western Athletic Conference during the 1998–99 men's basketball season. Led by head coach Rick Majerus, the Utes finished with an overall record of 28–5 (14–0 WAC).

Utah capped an impressive three-season stretch by winning 87 of 100 games overall and 41 of 44 games in conference play.

Roster

Schedule and results

|-
!colspan=9 | Regular Season
|-

|-
!colspan=9 | WAC Tournament
|-

|-
!colspan=9 | NCAA Tournament
|-

Rankings

Team players in the 1999 NBA draft

References

Utah Utes men's basketball seasons
Utah
Utah
Utah Utes
Utah Utes